MutS protein homolog 4 is a protein that in humans is encoded by the MSH4 gene.

Function 

The MSH4 and MSH5 proteins form a hetero-oligomeric structure (heterodimer) in yeast and humans.  In the yeast Saccharomyces cerevisiae MSH4 and MSH5 act specifically to facilitate crossovers between homologous chromosomes during meiosis.  The MSH4/MSH5 complex binds and stabilizes double Holliday junctions and promotes their resolution into crossover products.  An MSH4 hypomorphic (partially functional) mutant of S. cerevisiae showed a 30% genome wide reduction in crossover numbers, and a large number of meioses with non exchange chromosomes. Nevertheless this mutant gave rise to spore viability patterns suggesting that segregation of non-exchange chromosomes occurred efficiently. Thus, in S. cerevisiae, proper segregation apparently does not entirely depend on crossovers between homologous pairs.

The him-14 gene of the worm Caenorhabditis elegans encodes an ortholog of MSH4.  Formation of crossovers during C. elegans meiosis requires the him-14(MSH4) gene.  Loss of him-14(MSH-4) function severely reduces crossing over, resulting in lack of chiasmata between homologs and consequent missegregation. Thus, in C. elegans, segregation apparently does depend on crossovers between homologous pairs. Him-14(MSH4) functions during the pachytene stage of meiosis, indicating that it is not needed for establishing the preceding stages of pairing and synapsis of homologous chromosomes.

In an MSH4 mutant of rice, chiasma frequency was dramatically decreased to about 10% of the wild-type frequency, although the synaptonemal complex was normally installed.  It is likely that MSH4 interacts with MSH5  to promote the majority of crossovers during rice meiosis.

In general it appears that MSH4 acts during meiosis to direct the recombinational repair of some DNA double-strand breaks towards the crossover option rather than the non-cross over option (see Homologous recombination).

Interactions 

MSH4 has been shown to interact with MLH1, MSH5 and MLH3.

References

Further reading

External links 
 FAQs on HNPCC  from the National Institute of Health
  GeneReviews/NCBI/NIH/UW entry on Lynch syndrome